Mobile BASIC is a proprietary dialect of the BASIC programming language that can be used to program Java-enabled mobile phones. This is possible because the interpreter is a MIDlet.

External links
Mobile Phone Programming Home to the Mobile BASIC Java midlet.
MBTEAM.RU MobileBASIC IDE (Online/Offline)
Java device platform
Mobile software
BASIC interpreters